The Webley Stinger is an air pistol of British origin. The pistol is chambered to fire 45 .177 calibre ball bearings fed from an internal overhead gravity fed hopper. The Webley Stinger uses a slide action to fire each round.

References

Air guns of the United Kingdom
Air pistols